Darreh Lik (also Romanized as Darreh Līk and Darehlīk; also known as Darrekhlik) is a village in Zanjanrud-e Pain Rural District, Zanjanrud District, Zanjan County, Zanjan Province, Iran. At the 2006 census, its population was 419, in 103 families.

References 

Populated places in Zanjan County